Cheryl Healton is an American public health researcher who is Professor of Public Health Policy and Dean of School of Global Public Health at New York University. Her research considers public health policy surrounding tobacco control.

Early life and education 
Healton started her academic career at the New England College, where she majored in psychology and sociology. She earned a Master of Public Administration (MPA) in health policy and planning at New York University. She moved to Columbia University as a doctoral student, and earned a Doctor of Public Health (DrPH) in 1991. Her doctoral research considered the AIDS epidemic amongst young people from minority groups in urban areas.

Research and career 
Healton joined the faculty at Columbia University, where she held various leadership positions including Vice President for Health Sciences and Associate Dean for Program Development. In 2012 she moved to New York University, where she was made Dean of School of Global Public Health.

Healton has studied public health topics including HIV/AIDS, tobacco control and substance abuse. She is the founder of Legacy (now known as Truth Institute), an organization that is committed to tobacco control. The focus of Legacy is to enable young people to reject tobacco, and permit current smokers to quit. She created the youth tobacco prevention program “truth”, which was successful in reducing the number of young smokers. Legacy established the Steven A. Schroeder Institute for Tobacco Studies, as well as a national campaign on smoking cessation in 2007. She was made Dean of the School of Public Health. She focused on training public health practitioners such that they can meet the needs of the communities they serve.

During the COVID-19 pandemic, Healton joined the leadership team of the COVID collaborative.

Awards and honors 
 2013 Prevent Cancer Foundation James L. Mulshine, MD National Leadership Award
 2013 Society For Research On Nicotine and Tobacco President's Award
 2013 American Public Health Association Allan Rosenfield Award for Public Health and Social Justice

Selected publications

References 

New York University faculty
Columbia University Mailman School of Public Health alumni
Robert F. Wagner Graduate School of Public Service alumni
New England College alumni
Anti-smoking activists
Living people
Year of birth missing (living people)